Muhammetnur Halylov is Oil and Gas Minister in the Turkmenistan Cabinet of Ministers.

References

Year of birth missing (living people)
Living people
Government ministers of Turkmenistan